Teresa of St. Rose of Lima was the founder of the Institute of the Carmelite Sisters of St. Teresa (CSST) Congregation in Kerala, India.

Early life 
Teresa of St. Rose of Lima was born on 29 January 1858 in George Town, Madras, India, to Peter D’Lima and Mary D’Lima. She received the name Mary Grace on baptism. She studied with the Presentation nuns at George Town, Madras. After completing the schoolmistresses test, she joined the staff of St. Xavier's Free School, George Town, Madras in 1875. She took charge of St Joseph's School, Alleppey, Kerala as the headmistress in 1879.

Missionary life 
In May 1882 she was received as a postulant by the priest Candidus. She received formation directly from the Carmelite fathers. On 29 April 1883, she was vested and given the name Teresa of St. Rose of Lima. She made her religious profession as a Carmelite Tertiary at St. Joseph's Convent, Alleppey on 25 May 1885. She founded the Third Order of Our Lady of Mount Carmel known today as the Institute of the Carmelite Sisters of St. Teresa (CSST) on 24 April 1887 in Ernakulam, Kerala, India and also founded St. Teresa's English Medium School for Girls on 9 May 1887.

Death 
She died in a train accident on 12 September 1902 at Mangapatnam, Cuddapah, Andhra Pradesh, India.

Introduction of beatification cause 
The Archbishop of Bengaluru diocese Bernard Moras initiated the diocesan inquiry of cause of beatification and canonization of Teresa on 22 August 2015 and she was declared a Servant of God.

In popular culture 
Teresa Had A Dream, an Indian English-language biographical film directed by Raju Abraham was released in 2020. Produced by the Carmelite Sisters of St. Teresa, it focuses on her missionary work in India.

References

   

1858 births
1902 deaths
20th-century Indian Roman Catholic nuns
Founders of Indian schools and colleges
Roman Catholic missionaries in India
Venerated Carmelites
Women founders
People from Chennai
Railway accident deaths in India
Women school principals and headteachers
19th-century Indian Roman Catholic nuns